Remia is a Dutch producer of margarine, tomato ketchup, salad dressings and sauces, based in Den Dolder.

History 
Remia originated in October 1925, when Arie de Rooij began to produce margarine and butter in his Amersfoort-based garage and basement. Later, he started up a mixing plant in which margarine with butter was mixed. De Rooij's Electrical Melangeer Installation Amersfoort, abbreviated Remia was a fact. Remia then grew rapidly, and in 1951, the company moved to larger premises in Den Dolder. In 1960 a modern sauce factory was opened. Since then, the company is best known for its range of sauces.

Acquisitions
As of August 4, 2011 Remia took over the sauces activities of Van Dijk Food Products in Lopik. In addition, both companies entered into a strategic partnership. As of April 30, 2010 Remia took over the mustard-factory De Marne's Fabrieken BV from the France-based Gyma Group. In 2015 (1 February) Remia acquired Yillys Food Concepts B.V which is well-known for its Yil’driz sauce portfolio.

References

External links

Food and drink companies of the Netherlands
Food and drink companies established in 1925
1925 establishments in the Netherlands